Akrosida macrophylla, commonly known as the bigleaf akrosida, is a species of plant found in Brazil. It was first described by Oskar Eberhard Ulbrich, who called it Bastardia macrophylla.

References

Flora of Brazil
Malveae